Shankar's Virus (also known as W97M.Marker.o) is a polymorphic computer virus that infects Microsoft Word documents and templates. It was discovered on 3 June 1999.

Creation
The virus may have originated as a program initially intended to be used in conjunction with Microsoft Word 1997. Some sources attribute the name Sam Rogers to be the identity of a programmer who may have created the virus or contributed to its creation. One source contests that Shankar's Virus has existed since internet immemorial and cites the on/off code in the eighth sub-line of the viruses main code evidence that Sam Rogers or some other individual simply awoke it from dormancy. The polymorphic nature of its code caused some programmers to believe that the virus cycles between long period of activity and inactivity, during numerous iterations of this cycle it steadily absorbed more data from modern systems becoming much harder to delete over time. Potentially the virus can wield a limitless amount of capability within a system due to it having a unique code even for a polymorphic virus. An internet meme emerged in 2014 with Shankar's Virus as the subject matter

Effects
The virus hooks the Word event handler to close documents in order to run its code.

This virus infects documents and templates when a document is opened. It makes the following modifications to the infected documents:

Also, when opening or closing a Word document, a dialogue box pops up displaying the string text "Did you wish Shankar on his birthday?"

Shankar's virus is also able to affect a computer's time, being able to speed up or reverse time to restore itself (in a way similar to the system restore function) or create a copy of itself to remain inactive until a future time if it should be removed via an antivirus program. It is noted though that these actions visibly weaken its functions as Microsoft Word may stop malfunctioning after the virus manipulates the computer's time.

Should the Shankar's virus be activated on a mobile device or tablet (i.e. Microsoft Word on a mobile phone app) the resulting code of its adaptation could have destructive effects.

See also
List of computer viruses (S-Z)

References 

Macro viruses